Royal Liverpool may refer to:

 Royal Liverpool Golf Club, Hoylake
 Royal Liverpool Philharmonic
 Royal Liverpool University Hospital
 79th Regiment of Foot (Royal Liverpool Volunteers)